Kirk William Smith is a United States Air Force lieutenant general currently serving as the deputy commander of the United States Africa Command. Prior to that, he was the commander of the Special Operations Command Europe of the United States European Command.

Awards and decorations

Effective dates of promotions

References

Year of birth missing (living people)
Place of birth missing (living people)
Living people
United States Air Force Academy alumni
Troy University alumni
Recipients of the Defense Superior Service Medal
Recipients of the Legion of Merit